Lakshmi Kalyanam  is a 2007 Indian Telugu-language romantic action film directed by Teja. Nandamuri Kalyan Ram and Kajal Aggarwal played the lead roles. The film was released on 15 February 2007 and was declared an Average at the box office. The film was dubbed into Hindi as Meri Saugandh (2011) and into Tamil as Machakaalai. This film was Kajal's Telugu cinema and lead debut.

Plot
Two feuding villages form the backdrop of this story, with Ramu (Kalyan Ram) and Lakshmi (Kajal Aggarwal) belonging to one village and villain Giridhar (Ajay) to another. Lakshmi and Ramu are cousins, who grow up to love each other, which is not appreciated by Lakshmi's father, who is also the village head.

Meanwhile, Giridhar's evil eye falls upon Lakshmi when he chances upon her in college. He writes on her back in blood that he would marry her. This enrages Ramu who confronts Giridhar only to be taunted to prove his love towards Lakshmi by opening the doors of the temple, which is the bone of contention between the two villages.

Cast

 Kalyan Ram as Ramu
 Kajal Aggarwal as Lakshmi (Voice dubbed by Raasi (actress))
 Ajay as Giridhar
 Sayaji Shinde as Chenchuramaiah
 Srinivasa Reddy as Gopalam
 Suhasini as Parijatham
 Nagineedu as District Collector
 Prabha
 Subhashini
 Telangana Shakuntala
 Pavala Syamala
 Raghu Babu 
 Duvvasi Mohan
 Kondavalasa Lakshmana Rao
 Rallapalli
 Narra Venkateswara Rao
 J. V. Ramana Murthi
 Chittajalu Lakshmipati

Music

Audio of Lakshmi Kalyanam was released on 26 January 2007 at Big 92.7 FM radio station in Hyderabad. Big FM station director Ashwin launched the audio and gave the first unit to music director RP Patnaik. This function was also graced by Swapna (programming director of BIG FM), Jeethi (producer), Nihal, Pranathi and Malavika. Madhura Entertainment bought the audio rights.

Reception 
Jeevi of Idlebrain.com opined that "Kalyan Ram and Ajay are revelations in this film". A critic from Sify gave the film a verdict of "Run-of-the-mill" and wrote that "To cut a long story short, Lakshmi Kalyanam is regular commercial film". A critic from Full Hyderabad said that "Lakshmi Kalyanam is not a must-watch".

References

External links
 

2007 films
2000s Telugu-language films
Indian action drama films
Films directed by Teja (film director)
2000s action drama films